Carmen Moreno Raymundo is a Spanish diplomat who serves as the European Union ambassador to Cambodia and was the Spanish ambassador to Thailand, Myanmar, Laos and Cambodia From December 2012 until June 2017.

Moreno received a law degree from the Universidad Autónoma de Madrid.

References

Living people
Year of birth missing (living people)
Spanish women ambassadors
Autonomous University of Madrid alumni
Ambassadors of the European Union to Cambodia
Ambassadors of Spain to Thailand
Ambassadors of Spain to Laos
Ambassadors of Spain to Myanmar
Ambassadors of Spain to Cambodia